Kelly Moller (born 1972/1973) is an American politician serving in the Minnesota House of Representatives since 2019. A member of the Minnesota Democratic–Farmer–Labor Party (DFL), Moller represents District 40A in the north-central Twin Cities metropolitan area, which includes the cities of Mounds View and Shoreview and parts of Ramsey County, Minnesota.

Early life, education, and career
Moller attended the University of Notre Dame, graduating with a Bachelor of Business Administration in marketing and later Hamline University School of Law, graduating with a Juris Doctor.

Moller worked as a staff attorney in the Minnesota Attorney General's Office and served on the Shoreview City Public Safety Committee. Moller is an assistant attorney for Hennepin County, Minnesota.

Minnesota House of Representatives
Moller was first elected to the Minnesota House of Representatives in 2018, defeating Republican incumbent Randy Jessup, and has been reelected every two years since. Moller is chair of the Public Safety Finance and Policy Committee as well as the Ethics Committee. She sits on the Judiciary Finance and Civil Law, Rules and Legislative Administration, and Ways and Means Committees.

Electoral history

Personal life
Moller and her husband, Kevin, have two children. She resides in Shoreview, Minnesota.

References

External links

 Official House of Representatives website
 Official campaign website

1970s births
Living people
People from Shoreview, Minnesota
University of Notre Dame alumni
Hamline University School of Law alumni
Democratic Party members of the Minnesota House of Representatives
21st-century American politicians
21st-century American women politicians
Women state legislators in Minnesota